Okolchitsa;  is the highest peak in Vratsa mountains in the west part of Balkan Mountains. On the peak on June 2, 1876 the last battle of Hristo Botev's army took place.

References 

Balkan mountains